Nathalie Marie (born 21 June 1976 in Saint-Lô) is a French sprint canoer who competed in the mid-2000s. At the 2004 Summer Olympics in Athens, she was eliminated in the semifinals of the K-1 500 m event.

References
 Sports-Reference.com profile

1976 births
Canoeists at the 2004 Summer Olympics
French female canoeists
Living people
Olympic canoeists of France
Sportspeople from Manche